Doctor Light is a bipartite character comprising supervillain Arthur Light and superhero Jacob Finlay, appearing in comic books published by DC Comics.

His stint as Doctor Light is concurrent with that of a superheroine using the same name and a nearly identical costume, Kimiyo Hoshi. In 2009, Doctor Light was ranked as IGN's 84th-greatest comic book villain of all time.

He made his live-adaptation debut in one episode of the series Lois & Clark: The New Adventures of Superman, played by David Bowe. He also appeared in the second season of the DC Universe series Titans, played by Michael Mosley.

Publication history
Doctor Light first appeared in Justice League of America #12 and was created by Gardner Fox and Mike Sekowsky.

During the 1980s Doctor Light was transitioned from a serious menace to a comedic villain, a transformation which culminated in the DC Comics Bonus Book appearing in The Flash (vol. 2) #12 (May 1988).

Fictional character biography

Origin
Criminal physicist Doctor Arthur Light captures the League with light rays after first drawing them in by capturing Aquaman, then sending the League to different planets based on their weaknesses. He then orders Snapper Carr to write this down, before imprisoning him in a light field. He has not realized Superman and Batman impersonated each other, allowing Superman to escape the world he was sent to and rescue the other members. Light fools the League with three duplicates of himself that are apparently committing robberies of light-associated objects, though they are actually placing devices around the world. Green Lantern realizes this trick and fakes his death to track Doctor Light, finally stopping him before he pulls the lever that would have set off the light impulses allowing him to take over the world. A retcon introduced in Secret Origins #37 reveals that this character is actually the second Doctor Light. According to the retcon, his predecessor was his partner at S.T.A.R. Labs, a scientist named Jacob Finlay. Finlay created a technologically advanced suit to control light allowing him to be a minor superhero, but was accidentally killed by Arthur Light (though Finlay's death may have been caused by hiding his costume in a computer console, causing it to malfunction). Light took the suit and the "Doctor Light" codename. He is periodically haunted by Finlay's ghost through the years, but can use the light generated by the suit to drive off this spirit.

Through the Silver and Bronze Ages, Doctor Light is a minor but persistent foe for a number of heroes. He fights the Justice League's former sidekicks, the Teen Titans. 

In Justice League of America #136, he is one of King Kull's agents with which the Beast-Man hopes to wipe out humanity on all three Earths, helping in the attack on Earth-S by creating perpetual light and darkness on each side of the Earth, and teaming up with the Shade, Joker of Earth-Two, and Weeper II of Earth-S. He is turned to stone by King Kull's satellites, but restored when they are destroyed. Doctor Light is beaten by Hal Jordan not long after his defeat by the JLA.

He then founds the supervillain team the Fearsome Five, but they are also defeated by the Titans, and Light is violently expelled from the Five by his teammates. Each criminal caper leads to Light's defeat, but these defeats were used later as the basis of his humiliation that culminated in the Identity Crisis storyline.

Dr. Light was once defeated by Little Boy Blue and his Blue Boys—a group of non-superpowered children.

Suicide Squad
Driven by self-doubt and guilt, thanks in part to Finlay's ghostly presence, he volunteers for the Suicide Squad, a group of incarcerated supervillains who perform dangerous missions for the US government in exchange for clemency. On a mission against the patriotism-themed super-team called the "Force of July", he encounters Sparkler, the Force's youngest member. The presence of a super-powered child reminds him of past defeats and he lashes out, killing Sparkler with a blast through the chest.

During his time with the Squad, Light demonstrates a simple desire to be liked by the other members. He sees his chance when a mysterious pie-armed attacker is on the loose but after faking a hit nobody actually believes Light has been pied.

Finally, Finlay's ghost convinces Light to attempt a heroic turn during a mission where multiple members of the team, some unwillingly, have traveled to Apokolips. Light is swiftly shot dead by Parademons. Light is sent to Hell, where he is physically reunited with Finlay. Under the watch of a lesser demon and its annoying assistant, both men are released from Hell in turns and returned to life. Both only soon die again: Arthur Light suffocates while still inside his grave, while the desiccated Finlay claws his way out of his own grave but is killed by a family of religious vigilantes. Arthur Light is again returned to life, and barely survives a fall that his demonic tormentors may have intended to be fatal. Arthur also possesses the body of the female Doctor Light, Kimiyo Hoshi. With the aide of her teacher, Kimiyo rejects Arthur's presence. Doctor Light, freed of his ex-partner's hauntings, attempts to rejoin the Suicide Squad, but his appeal is summarily rejected by Amanda Waller.

He later becomes trapped in a Green Lantern power battery which would eventually come under the possession of Kyle Rayner, and as a consequence is temporarily transformed into living light. He later joins a short-lived incarnation of the Injustice Gang, in which he assists Lex Luthor in building holographic duplicates of the JLA.

Identity Crisis onwards
The 2004 miniseries Identity Crisis retroactively reveals that Doctor Light had raped Sue Dibny, wife of the superhero Elongated Man, on the JLA Satellite. Later issues reveal that he was a serial rapist. The Justice League resolve to alter his mind with Zatanna's magic so that he will no longer pose a threat. In the process, they accidentally give him a partial lobotomy, thus explaining how he fell from a plausible foe of the Justice League to a punching bag for the Teen Titans or Little Boy Blue. He later recovers his memories and intellect when witnessing a fight between the League members responsible for his mind-wipe and Deathstroke, and vowed revenge against the Justice League.

Doctor Light captures Green Arrow, using him as bait so he could get revenge on the Teen Titans. The entire Teen Titans roster, former and current, responds to the call, but he brutally defeats them. After a mass battle against the Titans wears him down, Cyborg uses a device to drain the light out of the area, rendering Light powerless. Batman and Batgirl appear to take him to prison, but reveal themselves to be Deathstroke and Ravager in disguise, and offer Light a place in the new Secret Society of Super Villains. Doctor Light, hungry for vengeance and power, readily accepts.

As a member of Alexander Luthor Jr.'s Secret Society of Super Villains, he aids Merlyn and Deathstroke in defeating Green Arrow in Star City. Doctor Light then attacks and absorbs a great deal of power from Kimiyo Hoshi. He later participates in the Battle of Metropolis in Infinite Crisis #7, where he is defeated by the combined efforts of the Ray, Black Canary, Martian Manhunter, and Kimiyo.

In the Justice League of America Wedding Special, Light is a member of the Injustice League Unlimited. During a battle with the Justice League, fellow Injustice Leaguer Cheetah betrays him and slashes him in the back because of her hatred of rapists. The entire Injustice League is captured and deported to an alien world by the Suicide Squad; Doctor Light is consequently one of the villains featured in Salvation Run.

After returning to Earth, in DC Universe #0, Doctor Light is a member of Libra's Secret Society of Super Villains. In Final Crisis #1, he and Mirror Master are sent by Libra to recover Metron's chair. They are briefly challenged by Empress, Sparx, and Más y Menos, but defeat them by combining Light's beams with Mirror Master's mirrors. Light also aids the Human Flame and Libra in the murder of the Martian Manhunter.

In Final Crisis: Revelations #1, the Spectre delivers final judgment on Doctor Light (who is discovered in the middle of a mock superhero rape orgy with various women dressed as Teen Titans), and burns him to death by turning him into a candle, using his head as the wick. The Milestone Comics group known as the Shadow Cabinet attempt to steal the remains of Light, still in the form of a candle. In actuality, Superman and Icon set this scenario up to familiarize the Shadow Cabinet with the JLA. The candle is, however, used by Hardware to restore to Kimiyo Hoshi the remaining powers Arthur stole from her.

During the "Blackest Night" storyline, Doctor Light is entombed below the Hall of Justice. His corpse is revived as a Black Lantern. He devours the remains of Gehenna's corpse, and attacks Kimiyo Hoshi. Arthur employs psychology to make Kimiyo doubt herself. Just as he is on the verge of victory, he threatens Kimiyo's children, enraging her to the point where she produces a light which incinerates Arthur and his ring.

The New 52
In 2011, "The New 52" rebooted the DC universe. Arthur Light is a scientist working with A.R.G.U.S. and the Justice League of America. As he is studying a communicator used by the Secret Society of Super Villains, he receives a "nasty call" and is engulfed in an explosion of light leaving his body glowing on the floor. Director Amanda Waller finds him transformed.

During the "Trinity War" storyline, Doctor Light is a reluctant member of the new Justice League of America, and expresses disgust over being made to harm Ronnie Raymond and Jason Rusch. During his first mission with the team, he is seemingly killed by Superman. The Phantom Stranger takes Batman, Katana, and Deadman to the afterlife to locate Doctor Light, but he doesn't remember anything about his death. The Phantom Stranger tells Doctor Light that he will try to free him from the afterlife, so he can be with his family. Doctor Light gives a piece of his soul to the Phantom Stranger in hopes that he can give it to his family as a final gift if he doesn't get out. It is later revealed that Atomica, who is from the alternate universe of Earth-3, is responsible for Doctor Light's death.

During the "Forever Evil" storyline, Doctor Light's body unleashes energy that destroys Washington, D.C.'s A.R.G.U.S. headquarters and exposes the A.R.G.U.S. Agents to it. Etta Candy is approached by an energy manifestation of Dr. Light. Doctor Light appears in Los Angeles and is found by the Crimson Men. The Crimson Men take Dr. Light to their secret location, and promise to make him human again in exchange for information on Steve Trevor. Dr. Light heads to Steve Trevor's location and states he must kill him for him to live. Killer Frost faces off against Doctor Light. Doctor Light hurls her into Steve's ice-block, freeing him. While Killer Frost holds Light back, Steve sneaks up behind him and wraps the Lasso of Truth around him. Compelled by its power, Doctor Light explains that he died and woke up confused. He was told what to do and where Steve would be. The Crimson Men had told him the truth that Arthur Light is dead. Horrified by his own self-realization, Doctor Light disappears in a blast of light energy.

Doctor Light later resurfaces, now sporting his classic appearance. He states that his human body is still dead, and that he now merely exists as a construct of living light energy. It is also implied that he used to be a villain prior to his brief stint as a member of the Justice League, indicating his backstory has been retconned to some degree. Having been cut off from his wife and daughters, Arthur has fled to the country of Chetland where he is given asylum in exchange for his services. After a conversation with Deathstroke, Arthur contemplates the possibility of returning to a life of villainy.

Powers and abilities
Doctor Light can control light for a variety of purposes. He can bend the light around him to become invisible, generate blasts of energy, create force fields, and fly. By mentally repulsing photons, Light can create areas of complete darkness. Teen Titans #23 implied that Light could "power up" by draining the ambient light in the area.

The limits of his powers are unclear, but he seems to be able to wrest control of anything that emits light. Such things have included Green Lantern constructs, Superboy's heat vision, and magic lightning from Wonder Girl's lasso. He is also able to take the "internal" light away from light powered characters, the heroic Doctor Light and the Ray, leaving them temporarily powerless. He also has the ability to create holographic images. Despite his frequent defeats, he is quite powerful.

Originally, Doctor Light derives his powers from his suit, but over time he internalizes this ability, and could use his powers without having to use his costume.

Arthur Light is mentally brilliant, a genius in the field of physics. However, his mind-wipe by the Justice League reduces his intelligence substantially, along with his skills for creative use of his powers. Light's recovery of his memories seems to have brought his intellect back with them and also his paraphilia. As a result, he becomes a much deadlier opponent.

Other versions

All-American Comics
A character named Doctor Light appears in All-American #82 (February 1947). This version is an enemy of Doctor Mid-Nite.

JLA/Avengers
In JLA/Avengers, Doctor Light is among the mind-controlled villains who attack the heroes as they assault Krona's Stronghold in issue #4. He is shown blasting Doorman.

DC Animated Universe Comics
Doctor Light appears in Adventures in the DC Universe #1, Justice League Adventures #6, #13 and DC Comics Presents: Wonder Woman Adventures #1.

Tiny Titans
Doctor Light appears in Tiny Titans. This version was the science teacher of Sidekick City Elementary School.

Tangent Comics
In the 1997 Tangent Comics (Earth-9) one-shot Metal Men, Doctor Light lends his name to the brand of cigarettes smoked by president Sam Schwartz—"Doctor Lite".

DC: The New Frontier
Doctor Light has a cameo appearance in DC: The New Frontier (Earth-21). He is seen during the famous speech by John F. Kennedy.

Nightwing: The New Order
Doctor Light was a superhuman living in Gotham City in the year 2040 when having active superpowers was banned. After being reportedly off of his power-dampening medicine for too long, Light was hunted down by Dick Grayson's Crusaders and arrested.

In other media

Television

 A variation of Doctor Light appeared in the Lois & Clark: The New Adventures of Superman episode "The Eyes Have It", portrayed by David Bowe. This version is Dr. Harry Leit, a scientist who stole an ultraviolet light beam and used it to blind Superman.
 Doctor Light appears in Teen Titans, voiced by Rodger Bumpass. This version is an incompetent yet formidable enemy of the Teen Titans, who see him as a nuisance and easily defeat him across most of his appearances.
 Doctor Light appears in Teen Titans Go!, voiced again by Rodger Bumpass.
 Dr. Arthur Light appears in the second season of the DC Universe series Titans, portrayed by Michael Mosley. A former physicist at the California Institute of Technology, this version acquired metahuman powers during a failed experiment involving light manipulation, became a criminal, and fought the Titans before he is incarcerated in San Quentin State Prison. Four years later, Light escapes from prison and joins forces with Deathstroke to defeat the Titans, only to mistakenly believe their plan went awry and leave to fulfill it himself, leading to Deathstroke killing him.

Film
 Doctor Light makes a cameo appearance in Justice League: The New Frontier.
 Doctor Light makes a cameo appearance in the opening scene of Superman vs. The Elite.
 Doctor Light makes a non-speaking cameo appearance in Teen Titans Go! To the Movies.

Video games
 Doctor Light appears as an unlockable character in the "Master of Games" mode of Teen Titans.
 Doctor Light appears as a non-player character in DC Universe Online as part of the "Sons of Trigon" DLC.
 Doctor Light appears as a playable character in Lego DC Super-Villains, voiced again by Rodger Bumpass.

Miscellaneous
The Teen Titans animated series incarnation of Doctor Light appears in Teen Titans Go!. Following a minor appearance in issue #30, he founds the Fearsome Five in issue #43, only to be scared into surrendering by Raven amidst an attack on Titans Tower.

References

External links
 Doctor Light at Comic Vine
 Golden Age Doctor Light biography

Characters created by Gardner Fox
Characters created by Mike Sekowsky
Comics characters introduced in 1962
DC Comics male supervillains
DC Comics metahumans
DC Comics scientists
Fictional characters who can manipulate light
Fictional characters who can turn invisible
Fictional characters with absorption or parasitic abilities
Fictional characters with anti-magic or power negation abilities
Fictional characters with energy-manipulation abilities
Fictional murderers
Fictional physicists
Fictional rapists